U.S. Route 231 (US 231) in Tennessee runs north–south for , entirely in Middle Tennessee, that starts south of Fayetteville at the Alabama state line, and ends north of Westmoreland at the Kentucky state line. For the majority of its length, between the Alabama state line and Trousdale County, it is concurrent with unsigned State Route 10 (SR 10).

Route description

Lincoln County

The highway begins at the Alabama state line in Lincoln County, just north of Hazel Green, Alabama, where it enters the state concurrent with SR 10 and US 431. They then go north through farmland and countryside and have an intersection with SR 275 before going through Park City (where the highway passes by Fayetteville Municipal Airport) and crossing a ridge into Fayetteville. Once in Fayetteville, they have a Y-intersection with SR 110 before going through a major business and crossing the Elk River to come to an intersection with  US 64 Bypass. Here, US 431 continues straight into downtown (along unsigned SR 273) while US 231/SR 10 turns east to follow US 64 Bypass, bypassing downtown along its southside. The highway now curves to the north before coming to an intersection with US 64/SR 15/SR 50, where US 64 Bypass ends and US 231/SR 10 continue north through some farmland, passing through Belleville, before climbing on top of the Highland Rim to cross into Moore County.

Moore and Bedford Counties

US 231/SR 10 then intersect and have a short concurrency with SR 129 as it straddles the county line with Lincoln County before crossing into Bedford County. The route then lowers down into the Nashville Basin and goes through more farmland before entering Shelbyville, first going through some suburbs before having a Y-intersection and becoming concurrent with SR 64/SR 130 (Lewis Avenue), crossing the Duck River, and entering downtown. SR 64/SR 130 then separate and turn east along Lane Street at an intersection with SR 82/SR 387 (Lane Parkway), with SR 82 and SR 10 joining US 231 Business along N Cannon Boulevard and Main Street while US 231 and SR 387 bypass downtown along its western side, where it has an intersection with US 41A/SR 16 (Elm Street). The highway comes to an intersection with Main Street, where US 231 Business and SR 387 come to an end while US 231/SR 10/SR 82 rejoin and pass through the northern part of town and some suburbs before having an interchange with SR 437 (Shelbyville Bypass). They also pass by Bomar Field, Shelbyville's airport, before leaving Shelbyville. They then pass just east of Fosterville before SR 82 separates and goes east, while US 231/SR 10 head north through more farmland and eventually cross into Rutherford County.

Rutherford County

The highway immediately passes through Fosterville before crossing a ridge to pass through Christiana, where it has a short concurrency with SR 269, before crossing another ridge and entering Murfreesboro. US 231/SR 10 first go through a suburban area with a few businesses, where it crosses the Middle Fork of the Stones River, before having an interchange with I-24 (Exit 81). They then go north through a major business district before having a Y-intersection and becoming concurrent with US 41/US 70S/SR 1/SR 99 and entering downtown. They then pass through downtown before coming to an intersection with SR 96, where SR 99 turns southwest to follow SR 96, US 41/US 70S/SR 1 continue north, and US 231/SR 10 turn northeast to become concurrent with SR 96. They begin passing through suburbs as SR 96 separates and turns east. US 231/SR 10 pass by Murfreesboro Municipal Airport, and have an intersection with SR 268, before passing by the VA hospital and leaving Murfreesboro soon after. The highway then crosses the East Fork of the Stones River to pass through Walterhill, where it has an X-intersection with SR 266, before going through farmland again and crossing into Wilson County.

Wilson County

US 231/SR 10 then immediately have an intersection with SR 452 (Bill France Boulevard), which provides access to Nashville Superspeedway and I-840, before passing right through the middle of Cedars of Lebanon State Park. They then immediately have an intersection with SR 265 before passing through more farmland and by a rock quarry before entering Lebanon just south of the I-40 interchange. They then have an interchange I-40 and go through a major business district, paralleling SR 266, before entering downtown and having an intersection with US 70 BUS/SR 24. US 231/SR 10 then continue north through downtown and have an intersection with US 70/SR 26 before going through some suburbs before leaving Lebanon. They then cross over the Cumberland River at Hunter's Point to enter Trousdale County.

Trousdale County

They then pass through more farmland until near the small community of Castalian Springs, where they come to an intersection with SR 25. Here, SR 10 becomes signed for the first time as a primary highway and leaves US 231 to go east concurrent with SR 25 while US 231 continues north concurrent with its new companion route, SR 376. US 231/SR 376 head northward to have an intersection with SR 260 before crossing into Sumner County.

Sumner County

The highway immediately enters the mountains of the Highland Rim shortly before entering Bransford where SR 376 comes to an end and US 231 becomes concurrent with US 31E/SR 6. US 31E/US 231/SR 6 wind their way through some mountains for a few miles before exiting the Highland Rim to enter Westmoreland and immediately have an intersection with SR 52. The highway bypasses downtown along its east side before leaving Westmoreland and heading north through rural farmland for several mile to the Kentucky state line, where US 231/US 31E cross into that state while SR 6 comes to an end.

History
In December 2020, the highway was shut down in the Wilson-Rutherford counties after a box truck had been playing an audio similar to what had been played from an RV before it detonated in Downtown Nashville. In suspicion of another potential bombing, the vehicle was searched for explosives. 

Authorities later stated that no explosives were found inside the vehicle. The highway was later reopened.

Junction list

Related routes

State Route 376

State Route 376 (SR 376) runs as a secret, or hidden designation on US 231 from its SR 25/SR 10 junction in Trousdale County to the US 31E (SR 6) junction in Bransford.

State Route 387

State Route 387 (SR 387) is the unsigned designation for US 231’s bypass of downtown Shelbyville (Lane Parkway/Colloredo Boulevard), with original route through downtown being signed as US 231 Business and SR 82 (N Cannon Boulevard/Main Street/unsigned SR 10).

References

External links

31-2
Transportation in Moore County, Tennessee
Transportation in Rutherford County, Tennessee
 Tennessee
Transportation in Lincoln County, Tennessee
Transportation in Bedford County, Tennessee
Transportation in Wilson County, Tennessee
Transportation in Trousdale County, Tennessee 
Transportation in Sumner County, Tennessee